The Saint Mary of Mount Virgin Roman Catholic Church is a historic church building located at 190 Sandford Street in the city of New Brunswick in Middlesex County, New Jersey. It was constructed during the tenure of Rev. Pasquale Mugnano (1888–1971), from Naples, who was pastor of the parish from 1923 to 1970. The building was added to the National Register of Historic Places on November 3, 2010, for its significance in art and architecture from 1928 to 1959.

History and description
The church was designed by Philadelphia architect Clyde Smythe Adams, Sr., in the Romanesque Revival style for the Italian-American community in New Brunswick. It was constructed from 1928 to 1929 by the John P. Hallahan construction company. In the 1930s, ecclesiastical artist, Gonippo G. Raggi, decorated the interior extensively, including large murals. The church also features 28 stained glass windows.

See also
 National Register of Historic Places listings in Middlesex County, New Jersey
 List of churches in the Roman Catholic Diocese of Metuchen

References

External links
 

Churches in New Brunswick, New Jersey
Roman Catholic churches in New Jersey
Romanesque Revival church buildings in New Jersey
Stone churches in New Jersey
National Register of Historic Places in Middlesex County, New Jersey
Churches on the National Register of Historic Places in New Jersey
Roman Catholic churches completed in 1929
1929 establishments in New Jersey
New Jersey Register of Historic Places